James Lynch ( – 31 October 1713) was an Irish Roman Catholic clergyman who served as Archbishop of Tuam from 1669 to 1713.

Born about 1623, he was appointed Archbishop of Tuam on 8 March 1669 and consecrated at Ghent on 16 May 1669. His principal consecrator was Eugenius Albertus d'Allamont, Bishop of Ghent, and his principal co-consecrators were Peter Talbot, Archbishop of Dublin and Nicholas French, Bishop of Ferns. It was not until 1671 that he was granted the pallium. Back in Ireland, he got on well with the civil authorities and was allowed to preach and teach. However, in 1674, he was arrested and compelled to go into exile. He died in office in Paris on 31 October 1713, aged 87 years old.

References

1623 births
1713 deaths
17th-century Roman Catholic archbishops in Ireland
People from County Galway
18th-century Roman Catholic archbishops in Ireland
Irish expatriates in France
Irish expatriates in Belgium
Roman Catholic archbishops of Tuam
Irish Roman Catholic archbishops